Little Angel (German: Engelein) is a 1914 German silent comedy film directed by Urban Gad and starring Asta Nielsen and Max Landa.

Cast
 Asta Nielsen as Jesta  
 Alfred Kühne as Redakteur Schneider  
 Max Landa as Peter J. Schneider 
 Fred Immler as Theodor Schiebstaedt  
 Bruno Kastner 
 Hanns Kräly as Hauslehrer  
 Adele Reuter-Eichberg as Meta Schiebstaedt 
 Martin Wolff
 Erner Hübsch

References

Bibliography
 Jennifer M. Kapczynski & Michael D. Richardson. A New History of German Cinema.

External links

1914 films
1914 comedy films
German comedy films
Films of the German Empire
Films directed by Urban Gad
German silent feature films
German black-and-white films
Silent comedy films
1910s German films
1910s German-language films